Petar Lubarda (Serbian Cyrillic: Петар Лубарда); 27 July 1907 – 13 February 1974) was a Serbian painter born in Ljubotinj Cetinje.

Biography

He was born in Ljubotinj, near Cetinje, Principality of Montenegro. Lubarda's father was an officer of the Royal Yugoslav Army who was killed by the Yugoslav Partisans, which left a mark on Lubarda's career and upbringing. He spent a part of the war years in a German prison camp. Lubarda self-declared as a Serb and sent a letter demanding that this information be included as a part of his biography in upcoming art catalogues as well as demanding that his work be presented as a part of Serbia's pavilion.

He studied painting in Belgrade and Paris. From 1932 until his death he lived in Belgrade, with exception of period 1946–1950 when he was a professor at an art school in Herceg Novi. His work is inspired by Serbian history and Montenegrin landscape.

His most preferred subject was the historic 1389 Battle of Kosovo, which Lubarda painted in various formats in more than 30 versions.

Lubarda won numerous awards including the prestigious Herder Prize, Medal of Honour by Calcutta Art Society in 1968 and many other awards in Europe, Brazil, New York City and Tokyo Biennale.

The house used by Petar Lubarda and his wife Vera located in Senjak, Belgrade, was turned into an art gallery featuring notable works by Lubarda and personal items.

Exhibitions 

 Gymnasium, Nikšić, 1925
 Casa dell' Arte Moderna Bragaglio, Rome, 1929
 French club, Belgrade, 1933
 Art pavilion, Belgrade, 1934
 Art gallery ULUS, Belgrade, 1951
 Galerie Yougoslavie, Paris, 1952
 Galerie Michel Warren, Paris, 1954
 Leicester Galleries, London, 1955
 Art pavilion, Podgorica, 1958
 Small gallery, Ljubljana, 1959
 Gallery of, Belgrade, 1961
 Galleria Penelope, Rome, 1962
 Gallery of House of JNA, Belgrade, 1962
 Rabotnički university, Skopje, 1963
 Gallery of House of JNA, Belgrade, 1964
 Museum of Contemporary Art, retrospective, Belgrade, 1967
 Contemporary Art Museum of Macedonia, Skopje, 1967
 Art Gallery "Josip Bepo Benković", Herceg Novi, 1967
 Art pavilion, Pogodrica, 1968
 Art museum SR Montenegro, Cetinje, 1968
 National museum, Kragujevac, 1968
 Art gallery of Belgrade Cultural Centre, 1968
 SANU Gallery, Belgrade, 1969
 House of culture "Olga Petrov", Opovo, 1969
 City museum, Sombor, 1970
 Art gallery, House of culture in Vrbas, 1970
 Art gallery of Belgrade Cultural Centre, Belgrade, 1971

Posthumous
 National museum, Belgrade, 1974
 Commemorative Exhibition, Skopje, 1974
 Lubarda's atelier, commemorative exhibition, Belgrade, 1974
 Collegium artisticum, retrospective, Sarajevo, 1978
 Modern gallery, Budva, 1978
 Modern gallery, retrospective, Ljubljana, 1978
 Museum of contemporary art, Belgrade, 1984
 Gallery of art of non-aligned countries "Josip Broz Tito", Podgorica
 Modern gallery, Budva, 1985
 Forum gallery, Nikšić, 1986
 Art Gallery "Josip Bepo Benković", Herceg Novi, 1989
 Biljarda, Cetinje, 1994
 Contemporary Art Museum of Macedonia, Skopje, 1998
 Gallery "Nikola I", Nikšić, 2000
 Palace of Nikola I, Bar, 2000
 Galeria Lorber, Shenkar College of Engineering and Desine, Ramat-Gan, Israel, 2004
 Gallery of Radio Television of Serbia, Belgrade, 2007
 Belgrade gallery, Belgrade, 2007
 Heritage house, Belgrade, 2014

Awards 
 Grand Prix, World exhibit, Paris, 1937
 I award at an international exhibition, The Hague, 1939
 I federal award of Yugoslavia, Belgrade, 1948
 I state award of SR Montenegro, Cetinje, 1948
 I state award of SR Montenegro, Цетиње, 1949
 International award, Biennale, São Paulo, 1953
 Biennale award, Tokyo, 1955
 October award of city of Belgrade, Belgrade, 1955
 National award - Guggenheim, New York City, 1956
 7 July award, Belgrade, 1964
 Order of brotherhood and unity, Belgrade, 1965
 Order of merit for the people with golden wreath, Belgrade, 1965
 AVNOJ award, Belgrade, 1966
 I award of gallery „13th November“, Cetinje, 1967
 Diploma of city of Belgrade, Belgrade, 1969
 Medal of Honour "Tagore" by Calcutta Art Society, Kolkata, 1970
 Herder Prize, Vienna, 1973
 Honorary citizen of Slovenj Gradec 
 Honorary citizen of Kragujevac

Gallery

References

External links
 
 Petar Lubarda – Artwork Images, Exhibitions, Reviews at World Wide Arts Resources
 Lubarda about himself
 Petar Lubarda in The Art History Journal

Further reading

 
 
 Predrag Milosavljević, Miodrag B. Protić, Umetnička galerija ULUS, Belgrade, 1951
 Žan Kasu, Jugoslovenska galerija, Paris, 1952
 Milan Kašanin, Savremeni beogradski umetnici. pages 31–32, Prosveta, Belgrade, 1953
 Miodrag B. Protić, Savremenici I, Nolit, Belgrade, 1955
 Oto Bihalji Merin, Lubarda - Kosovski boj, Jugoslavija, Belgrade, 1956
 Miodrag B. Protić, Galerija Kulturnog centra, Belgrade, 1961
 Lazar Trifunović, Petar Lubarda, III kolo edicije Slikari i vajari, Prosveta, Belgrade, 1964
 Aleksa Čelebonović, Savremeno slikarstvo u Jugoslaviji. pages 39–40, Izdavački zavod Jugoslavija, Belgrade, 1965
 Miodrag B. Protić, Muzej savremene umetnosti, Belgrade, 1967
 Stanislav Živković, Galerija SANU, Belgrade, 1969
 Miodrag B. Protić, Srpsko slikarsvo XX veka, Nolit, Belgrade, 1970
 Sreto Bošnjak, Likovna galerija Kulturnog centra, Belgrade, 1971
 Lazar Trifunović, Srpsko slikarstvo 1900–1950, Nolit, Belgrade, 1973
 Olga Perović, Collegium artisticum, Sarajevo, 1978
 Mala enciklopedija Prosveta: Opšta enciklopedija, volume II, page 429, Prosveta, Belgrade, 1978
 Lazar Trifunović, Od impresionizma do enformela. pages. 55–69, Nolit, Belgrade, 1982
 Miodrag B. Protić, Slikarstvo XX veka, Jugoslavija, Belgrade, Spektar, Zagreb, Prva književna komuna, Mostar, 1982
 Ješa Denegri, Dragoslav Đorđević, Marija Pušić, Muzej savremene umetnosti, Belgrade, 1984
 Likovna enciklopedija Jugoslavije, volume II. page 209, Jugoslavenski leksikografski zavod „Miroslav Krleža“, Zagreb, 1984
 Jasna Tijardović, Galerija „Forum“, Nikšić, 1986
 Ješa Denegri, Pedesete: teme srpske umetnosti, Svetovi, Novi Sad, 1993
 Aleksa Brajović, Slika i misao Petra Lubarde, Zvonik, Belgrade, 2001
 Group of aurhos, Petar Lubarda, Radionica duše, Belgrade, 2002
 Ksenija Samardžija, Srđa Zlopaša, Stevan Vuković, Kuća legata, Legat Petra Lubarde, Belgrade, 2014
 Enciklopedija leksikografskog zavoda, volume IV. page. 651, Jugoslavenski leksikografski zavod, Zagreb
 Enciklopedija leksikografskog zavoda, volume III. pages 343–344, Jugoslavenski leksikografski zavod, Zagreb

1907 births
1974 deaths
Artists from Cetinje
Artists from Belgrade
Yugoslav painters
20th-century male artists
Burials at Belgrade New Cemetery
Herder Prize recipients